Xiaoshi is a town in and the former seat of Benxi Manchu Autonomous County in eastern Liaoning province, China. , it has 18 villages under its administration.

See also
List of township-level divisions of Liaoning

References

Towns in Liaoning
Benxi Manchu Autonomous County